The Caraballo Mountains is a mountain range in the central part of Luzon island in the Philippines, situated between the Cordillera Central and Sierra Madre mountain ranges. The mountains serve as the location of the river source of the Cagayan River, the longest in the country.

Several portions of the mountain range are protected under the National Integrated Protected Areas System, including the Casecnan Protected Landscape and the Pantabangan–Carranglan Watershed Forest Reserve.

Gallery

See also 
 Geography of the Philippines
 Battle for the Villa Verde Trail

Mountain ranges of the Philippines
Landforms of Nueva Vizcaya
Landforms of Quirino
Landforms of Nueva Ecija